Coventry v Lawrence (No. 3) was a  2015 judgment of the Supreme Court of the United Kingdom concerning the compatibility of the Access to Justice Act 1999 with the European Convention on Human Rights.

Facts
The case is a follow up to Coventry v Lawrence and Coventry v Lawrence (No. 2) and originally began as a claim in nuisance against the operators of a local speedway stadium by two local residents.

The residents' lawyers acted under a conditional fee agreement also more commonly known as 'no win no fee'. They eventually won the case and the stadium owner was ordered to pay 60% of the other sides costs. This included not only their base costs but also a success fee and an After-the-Event (ATE) insurance premium. In this case the stadium owner did not challenge his liability to pay the base costs but argued that his liability for both the success fee and ATE premium would infringe his article 6 (right to a fair trial) and/or article 1 of the first protocol (right to the peaceful enjoyment of one's possessions) rights.

Judgment

Supreme Court
In Callery v Gray [2002] UKHL 28 Lord Bingham noted that the Access to Justice Act 1999 has three principal aims:
 To contain the rising cost of legal aid.
 To improve access to the courts for claimant with meritorious claims.
 To discourage weak claims.
In spite of this the European Court of Human Rights held in MGN Ltd v UK (2011) 53 EHRR 5 that the scheme had a number of flaws that made it incompatible with Article 10 of the European Convention on Human Rights.

Lord Neuberger gave the leading judgment of the court and held that the present case is not about the flaws of the Access to Justice Act 1999 but rather whether it is a proportionate way of achieving the aims set out by Lord Bingham. With this in mind Neuberger held that:

It was noted that there is no scheme that will perfectly provide access to justice in the wake of the withdrawal of legal aid from most civil cases yet the European Court of Human Rights acknowledges that any such scheme may still be compatible with the European Convention on Human Rights even where it operates harshly in certain individual cases. Overall the Access to Justice Act 1999 provides a "rational and coherent scheme for providing access to justice" that is compatible with the Convention.

Dissenting judgment
Lord Clarke (with whom Lady Hale agreed) gave a dissenting judgment that suggested the Access to Justice Act 1999 was not compatible with the Convention because it discriminated between defendants and imposed heavy liabilities on some but not others.

Reaction
Reacting to the judgment David Greene said:

Others have considered the potential impact if the minority judgment had been successful:

It has also been suggested that the case may be taken to the European Court of Human Rights.

See also
European Convention on Human Rights
Human rights in the United Kingdom
2015 Judgments of the Supreme Court of the United Kingdom
Costs in English law

References

External links
Supreme Court judgment
Video of the judgment

Supreme Court of the United Kingdom cases
2015 in British law
2015 in case law
Human rights in the United Kingdom